Sompting & North Lancing is an electoral division of West Sussex in the United Kingdom, and returns one member to sit on the West Sussex County Council.

Extent
The division covers the neighbourhoods of North Lancing and Sompting, and the hamlets of Coombes and Sompting Abbotts. It also includes Lancing College.

It comprises the following Adur district wards: Cokeham Ward, the north part of Manor Ward, and Peverel Ward; and the following civil parishes: Coombes, the north part of Lancing, and Sompting.

2013 Election
Results of the election held on 2 May 2013:

2009 Election
Results of the election which took place on 4 June 2009:

References
Election Results - West Sussex County Council

External links
 West Sussex County Council
 Election Maps

Electoral Divisions of West Sussex